Hibbertia pilulis is a species of flowering plant in the family Dilleniaceae and is endemic to Arnhem Land in the Northern Territory. It is a straggly shrub with hairy foliage, elliptic leaves and yellow flowers arranged singly in leaf axils with 34 to 46 stamens arranged in bundles around two carpels.

Description
Flowering occurs from December to June.

Taxonomy
Hibbertia pilulis was first formally described in 2010 by Hellmut R. Toelken in the Journal of the Adelaide Botanic Gardens from specimens collected by Clyde Dunlop in 1980 in Deaf Adder Gorge. The specific epithet (pilulis) means "small balls", referring to the small spherical flower buds on long peduncles.

Distribution and habitat
This hibbertia grows in scrub vegetation on top of the Arnhem Land Sandstone Plateau in the northern part of the Northern Territory.

Conservation status
Hibbertia pilulis is classified as of "least concern" under the Territory Parks and Wildlife Conservation Act 1976.

See also
List of Hibbertia species

References

pilulis
Flora of the Northern Territory
Plants described in 2010
Taxa named by Hellmut R. Toelken